Nir Yaniv is an Israeli multidisciplinary artist.

He was active early on as a science fiction editor in Israel. In 2000 he founded the webzine of the Israeli Society for Science Fiction and Fantasy, and in 2007 he became chief editor of Chalomot Be'aspamia, Israel's only professionally printed SF&F magazine.

As an author, Yaniv's short fiction has appeared in Weird Tales, Apex Magazine, The Best of World SF and others. He collaborated with World Fantasy Award winning author Lavie Tidhar on two novels, including the "deranged sci-fi extravaganza" (per The Jewish Quarterly) The Tel Aviv Dossier and released the English language collection The Love Machine & Other Contraptions.

Yaniv has been active as a musician from early on, initially with the Israeli jazz-funk band Plutonium and more recently with the Emmy Award winning soprano Hila Plitmann. He released several independent albums, including "the first Hebrew-language SF Music themed album", The Universe in a Pita.

From 2013 he has also been making short films as a writer/director, including the animated Liftoff, a "touching, hand-illustrated piece of a man’s journey to the moon".

Fiction

In Hebrew
 Ktov Ke'shed Mi'shachat (One Hell of a Writer). Israel: Odyssey Press, 2006. A short story collection.
 Retzach Bidyoni (Fictional Murder). Israel: Odyssey Press, 2009. A novel, with Lavie Tidhar.
 Melech Yerushlaim (King of Jerusalem). Israel: Yaniv Publishing, 2019. a novel.

In English
 The Tel Aviv Dossier. Canada: ChiZine Publications, 2009. A novel, with Lavie Tidhar.
 The Love Machine & Other Contraptions. UK: Infinity Plus Books, 2012. A short story collection.

Selected Short Stories

 "A Wizard on the Road". Shimmer Magazine, 2006
 "The Dream of the Blue Man". Weird Tales, September 2008
 "A Painter, a Sheep, and a Boa Constrictor". Shimmer Magazine, 2009. Reprinted in The Year's Best Science Fiction & Fantasy: 2010  ed. Rich Horton (2010).
 "Benjamin Schneider’s Little Greys". Apex Magazine, November 2009. Reprinted in The Best of World SF, ed Lavie Tidhar (2021).
 "The Believers". Chizine, March 2010. Reprinted in Zion's Fiction: A Treasury of Israeli Speculative Literature, ed. Lottem & Teitelbaum.
 "Undercity". Apex Magazine, August 2012.

Music 
 The Universe in a Pita: a Hebrew science fiction rock album.
 Funkapella: a concept-album using vocals and drums only, with no other instruments.
 Happiness is Real: a live dance and music performance with choreographer and dancer Ilanit Tadmor.
 The Voice Remains

Short Film 

 MicroTime (2013)
 Liftoff (2014): Animation
 Memories of a Third Planet: Animation
 Addict (2017)

References

External links
 Nir Yaniv's web site (English)

1972 births
Living people
Israeli musicians
Israeli science fiction writers
Israeli male short story writers
Israeli short story writers
People from Jerusalem